South Esk Pine Reserve is a  nature reserve in eastern Tasmania, Australia,  north-east of Hobart, on the Apsley River near Coles Bay.  It is owned and managed by Bush Heritage Australia (BHA), by which it was purchased in 1998.

Natural values
The reserve protects the last large stand of the Tasmanian endemic conifer South Esk Pine.  This tree is considered vulnerable, with only 10,000 trees remaining.

References

External links
 Bush Heritage Australia

Bush Heritage Australia reserves
Nature reserves in Tasmania
Tasmanian forests
1998 establishments in Australia